Events in the year 1684 in Norway.

Incumbents
Monarch: Christian V

Events
HDMS Lossen is launched.

Arts and literature

Births

3 January – Jürgen Christoph von Koppelow,  nobleman and officer (d. 1770)
3 December (Julian calendar) – Ludvig Holberg, philosopher, historian, essayist and playwright (d. 1754).

Deaths

See also

References